Specker See is a lake in the Mecklenburgische Seenplatte district in Mecklenburg-Vorpommern, Germany.

Lakes of Mecklenburg-Western Pomerania